Andrey Pantev , ; born March 26, 1939; Rakovitsa, Vidin Province is a Bulgarian historian, a member-academician of the World Academy of Sciences and the Bulgarian Academy of Sciences.

After graduating as a historian, he specialized in a number of research centers in Great Britain since 1969 and in the United States since 1979. He also participated in politics after the Revolutions of 1989. He is a specialist  in the history of Great Britain and the USA.

Bibliography 
 Англия срещу Русия на Балканите: 1879-1894 (England versus Russia in the Balkans: 1879–1894), 1972  
 Българския въпрос във Великобритания 1876 (The Bulgarian Question in Great Britain 1876), 1981  
 Историческа българистика в Англия и САЩ 1856-1919 (Historical Bulgarian Studies in England and the United States 1856–1919), 1986  
 Революция и реформи в Западна Европа и Северна Америка, XVII–XVIII в., 1988  
 Христофор Колумб и новият свят, за деца, 1989  
 Защо две Америки, 1991  
 История на България. Т. 7, 1991, съавт.
 Години на демокрация?, 1992  
 История на България, 1993, съавт.
 Раждането на модерната демокрация, 1993  
 US Project for Determining the Borders of Bulgaria: 1918-1919, USA, 1993  
 САЩ и българския териториален въпрос 1919, на английски, Ню Лексингтън, Охайо, 1993  
 История на новото време, 1994, съавт.
 Проблеми на новата и най-новата стопанска история, 1994, съавт.
 Стефан Стамболов – хъшът държавник, или 'Българският Бисмарк' , 1994  
 Хронологична енциклопедия на света, т. V, 1995, съавт.
 За Стамболов в часа на България, 1995  
 Cultural and Intercultural Traditional Perspectives in Europe, Strasburg, 1995  
 Българският април 1876 в Англия и САЩ, 1996  
 Историческата еволюция и политическа демокрация, 1997  
 Другата версия, 1998  (The Other Version)
 100 най-известни българи в нашата история, 1997, ed. (100 most famous Bulgarians in our history)
 Гладстон и българите, 1999, ed. (Gladstone and the Bulgarians)
 Светът след Иисус, 1999, ed. (The World Since Jesus)
 Стоте най-влиятелни българи в нашата история, 1999 (The Hundred Most Influential Bulgarians in Our History)
 Исторически многоточия, 1999 (Historical notes)
 Българската история в европейския контекст, 2000 (Bulgarian History in the European Context)
 Сир, това е революция, 2001  ("Sir, this is a revolution")
 Исторически въпросителни изд, RIVA, Sofia, 2003  
 Носът на Клеопатра изд, RIVA, Sofia, 2004

References

20th-century Bulgarian historians
Academic staff of Sofia University
Members of the Bulgarian Academy of Sciences
TWAS fellows
Sofia University alumni
1939 births
Living people
21st-century Bulgarian historians